Sathyaa is a 1988 Indian Tamil-language gangster film directed and co-written by Suresh Krissna in his directorial debut. Produced by Kamal Haasan, the film stars him and Amala, with Rajesh, Janagaraj, Bahadoor and Kitty in supporting roles. A remake of the 1985 Hindi film Arjun, it revolves around an unemployed youth who cannot tolerate injustice in his community.

Sathyaa was released on 29 January 1988. The film was a commercial success, running for over 150 days in theatres, it become one of the highest grossing tamil film of the year and Kitty won the Cinema Express Award for Best Villain Actor. A spiritual successor, Dha Dha 87, was released in 2019.

Plot 
Sathyamurthy "Sathyaa" is an unemployed youth who does not tolerate injustice anywhere. He stays with his father Rajarathnam Mudaliar, who is the sole breadwinner for his family despite his elderly age, stepmother, and stepsister Sudha. One day, Sathyaa beats a group of rogues who are thrashing a tea vendor for not paying extortion money. These ruffians are the henchmen of a local goon named Rangan, who works for the local MLA Mariappa. With this incident, Sathya's life changes as he invokes Rangan's wrath. In retribution, Rangan and his men humiliate Sudha in public, forcing Sathya to thrash Rangan and destroy his bar. Sathya falls in love with Geetha Nair, a Malayali woman who works as a salesperson in a cloth shop, and begins to grab public attention, as he and his friends start taking the law into their own hands, thrashing anyone who tries to break the law. Mariappa also learns about Sathyaa and thinks that he is working for his arch-rival Dhandapani, a social reformer.

Mariappa orders that Sathyaa and his friends be eliminated. Mariappa's gang attacks and kills Sathya's friend Sundar, in full public view. Though Sathyaa tries his best, no one comes forward to give witness to the murder out of fear, and the murderers are soon released due to lack of evidence. An enraged Sathyaa thrashes the murderers on their release and is arrested, but is released on bail by Dhandapani. Sathyaa's family disowns him for his activities, following which he is approached by Dhandapani, who convinces him to move to his own house and work for him. Finally, Dhandapani tells Sathyaa to get some secret files and documents against Mariappa, which can be used to expose him in public. Risking his life, Sathyaa gets a hold of the files.

Sathyaa later comes to know that Dhandapani is a corrupt man and double-crosser who used the evidence against Mariappa to join hands with him and contest the upcoming election in his place, and none of the evidence collected has been published anywhere. Sathyaa also finds out that his services are no longer needed by Dhandapani, and he is thrown out of his house. Enraged and betrayed, Sathyaa barges into a political meeting where Mariappa and Dhandapani are present and tries to expose Dhandapani, but is forced out and thrashed by the workers of Mariappa's party. Few days later, Sathyaa sneaks into Dhandapani's house and takes the file containing evidence of both Mariappa's and Dhandapani's illegal activities. While on the run from Dhandapani's henchmen, Sathyaa gets shot and seriously injured, but manages to survive and is hospitalised. After regaining consciousness, Sathyaa learns that the evidence against Mariappa and Dhandapani is destroyed as he used the file as a shield against the gunshots. Sathyaa escapes from the hospital, confronts Mariappa and Dhandapani and kills them both.

Cast 

Guest appearances
 Delhi Ganesh as Ramanathan
 Vaali as Mariappa's associate
 Lakshmi Narayanan as Mariappa's associate

Production 
Sathyaa is a remake of the 1985 Hindi film Arjun. It marked the directorial debut of Suresh Krissna who earlier assisted K. Balachander. Krissna avoided creating a shot-for-shot remake of Arjun; according to him, "we took only basic theme from the original and worked on it". Kitty, who played one of the antagonists, had his voice dubbed by S. P. Balasubrahmanyam. The film was dedicated to M. G. Ramachandran, to whom Kamal Haasan considered it as "Guru Dakshina".

Themes and influences 
Sathyaa is basically the story of one man, who wants to make a difference and ends up becoming a henchman to a political leader who has his own agenda. The film is an effective commentary on the sorry state of such unemployed youngsters and the resulting unwilling choices they have to make to earn money. It clearly shows us how the youth, in their time of need, become willing toys in the hands of the people with the money to hire them.

Soundtrack 
The soundtrack was composed by Ilaiyaraaja, and lyrics were penned by Vaali. The song "Valayosai" was initially intended for Ilaiyaraaja's studio album How to Name It?. It had been composed, but not recorded, and was included in Sathyaa at Haasan's insistence. After learning that Lata Mangeshkar would be visiting Madras to sing for another project, Haasan asked Krissna if she could also sing for Sathyaa. Krissna agreed, and the song was "Valayosai". As Mangeshkar did not know Tamil, Balasubrahmanyam helped her with diction. The song is set in Sindhu Bhairavi, a Carnatic raga.

Release and reception 
Sathyaa was released on 29 January 1988. Angela Joseph of Screen called Sathyaa "another gem in [Haasan's] mission for good cinema and acting. By shrewdly intertwining commercial ingredients with a good story and brilliant acting, Kamal is propagating love and appreciation for good cinema among the masses". Kitty won the Cinema Express Award for Best Villain Actor.

Legacy 
Haasan's looks as Sathyaa became a rage among the public. The 2017 film Sathya was titled after the 1988 film after its lead actor Sibi Sathyaraj got permission from Haasan. A spiritual successor to Sathyaa, Dha Dha 87, was released in 2019, and featured Janagaraj reprising his role.

References

External links 
 

1980s Tamil-language films
1988 directorial debut films
1988 films
Films directed by Suresh Krissna
Films scored by Ilaiyaraaja
Indian gangster films
Tamil remakes of Hindi films
Unemployment in fiction